S. Ravindhron (born 9 November 1952) is a former Indian cricket umpire. He stood in one ODI game in 1986.

See also
 List of One Day International cricket umpires

References

1952 births
Living people
Indian One Day International cricket umpires
Place of birth missing (living people)